Thomas Eugene Connell (born 25 November 1957) is a Northern Irish former footballer, who played as a defender.

Born in Newry, he played for Newry Town, Manchester United, Coleraine, Portadown and Glentoran.

References

External links
MUFCInfo.com profile

1957 births
Association footballers from Northern Ireland
Newry City F.C. players
Manchester United F.C. players
Coleraine F.C. players
Glentoran F.C. players
Living people
Northern Ireland international footballers
Portadown F.C. players
English Football League players
Sportspeople from Newry
Association football fullbacks